Karyn White is the debut album by American R&B singer Karyn White. The album was released on September 6, 1988 by Warner Bros., and went to #1 on the R&B albums chart for seven weeks the following year. The album was certified Platinum by the RIAA on April 4, 1989. It gave her four hits, "The Way You Love Me", "Superwoman", "Love Saw It" and "Secret Rendezvous". The former three were #1 singles on the R&B chart, and all except "Love Saw It" were Top-10 successes on the Hot 100 ("Love Saw It" never appeared on the pop chart at all). A re-issue in late 1989 of "Secret Rendezvous" in the UK reached #22, as opposed to the original top 50 placing. "Superwoman" became her biggest hit there, reaching #11 in the UK Singles Chart.

White co-wrote two songs on the album.

Track listing

Personnel
Karyn White – lead and backing vocals
Babyface – acoustic and electric guitars, keyboards, backing and duet vocals
O'Bryan Burnette, Carmen Carter, Shaun Earl, Kim Eurisa, Niki Haris,  Bunny Hull, Debra Hurd, Sharon Robinson, Evan Rogers – backing vocals
Steve Harvey, Jeff Lorber, Ian Prince – keyboards, programming
Donald Griffin, Dann Huff – guitars
Kayo – synthesized and electric bass, synth guitar
Gary Meek – sax
Daryl Simmons – drums, percussion, timbales

Charts

Weekly charts

Year-end charts

Certifications

See also
List of Billboard number-one R&B albums of 1989

References

1988 debut albums
Karyn White albums
Albums produced by L.A. Reid
Albums produced by Babyface (musician)
Warner Records albums